Karanveer Singh (born 8 November 1987 Chandigarh, Punjab) is an Indian cricketer, who has played in the IPL and Champions League Twenty20 for Kings XI Punjab.

References

External links 
 

Punjab Kings cricketers
1987 births
Living people
Himachal Pradesh cricketers
Cricketers from Chandigarh
Indian cricketers
Chandigarh Lions cricketers